Langewiesche may refer to:

 Dieter Langewiesche (born 1943), German historian
 Karl Robert Langewiesche (1874-1931), German publisher
 William Langewiesche, American author and journalist; son of Wolfgang Langewiesche
 Wolfgang Langewiesche (1907–2002), aviator, author and journalist; father of William Langewiesche